Quonset Point, also known simply as Quonset, is a small peninsula in Narragansett Bay in the town of North Kingstown, Rhode Island. Its name is widely known from the Quonset hut, which was first manufactured there. Quonset is an Algonquian word meaning "small, long place".

Quonset Point was the location of Naval Air Station Quonset Point, a large United States Navy base. The peninsula is now used for industrial purposes and is partially abandoned.  A major industry located there is a hull-fabrication and outfitting facility for Electric Boat Corporation.  It was also home to Camp Endicott, home to the Atlantic fleet Seabees.

Quonset Point is currently home to Quonset State Airport  which is a joint civil-military public airport home to the Quonset Point Air National Guard Station and the 143d Airlift Wing (143 AW) of the Rhode Island Air National Guard, flying the C-130J Hercules.

Rhode Island Route 403 is a freeway branching from Rhode Island Route 4 that serves the area. Quonset is also served by a railroad spur from Amtrak's Northeast Corridor. The Providence and Worcester Railroad provides freight service along this stretch of the Corridor.

Port of Davisville

It is a former United States Navy surveillance ship acquired by the NOAA and converted into a deep-sea research vessel.

Transportation

Quonset Point can be reached by air and sea, as well as by road.

Ferry service to and from Oak Bluffs, Martha's Vineyard is provided by Rhode Island Fast Ferry, and the port of Davisville offers berths for commercial shipping. The Quonset Airport is a general aviation facility with a  runway and a staffed control tower. Interstate 95 is nearby, and Rhode Island Public Transit Authority (RIPTA) buses also serve Quonset Point.

Ferry dock
The ferry dock at Quonset Point is the main terminal for the Martha's Vineyard Fast Ferry's high-speed ferry Millennium to Oak Bluffs, Massachusetts. A shuttle bus leaves every hour before the ferry departs; and after the ferry arrives, a bus travels to the Providence Airport (T. F. Green State Airport) and the Kingston Amtrak train station.

Events

Air show 
The Rhode Island Air Show is held annually by the Rhode Island National Guard and is perhaps the most well-known event to take place on Quonset Point.
The event began in 1991 as a relatively minor aviation exhibition but grew in attendance each year, with the USAF Thunderbirds performing every even year and the USN Blue Angels performing every odd year. The Rhode Island National Guard also displayed their locally based C-130J Hercules aircraft and UH-60 Blackhawk helicopters in combined forces demos. Military aircraft demonstrations that have been featured in the past have included the F-22 Raptor (2007, 2009 and 2014), F-16 Fighting Falcon (2003, 2009, 2011), A-10 Thunderbolt II (2006, 2010), F-15E Strike Eagle (2007, 2008), EA-6B Prowler (2012), F/A-18C Hornet (2006, 2008, 2010), F/A-18F Super Hornet (2007) and AV-8B Harrier (2008) while civilian performers have included Sean D. Tucker, John Klatt, and Michael Goulian as well as the GEICO Skytypers.
Attendance in 2011 was so high that the show was sold out after parking locations filled up. The 2012 show yielded a similar audience, and each previous year had a normal attendance of over 200,000.
However, in 2013 the show was officially canceled due to federal budget cuts, this caused all USAF units to cut aviation support to public events and the grounding of both the USN Blue Angels and USAF Thunderbirds, show organizers considered continuing the event as an all-civilian air show featuring aerobatic acts with the GEICO Skytypers being the headlining act however the National Guard stated that a show that exclusively featured civilian performers could not take place at a military installation, no such event took place in 2013.

In October 2013, internet rumors have surfaced about a possible 2014 show and how the Air National Guard was rounding up sponsors and performers for the event to return in 2014 with at least one major returning jet team to be featured, the USN Blue Angels which were supposed to headline in 2013 had already released their 2014 schedule which did not include Quonset while the USAF Thunderbirds which had headlined at the last show in 2012 had not yet released their schedule and a spokesperson for the team said that plans for the 2014 season were still underway.

In early December 2013, the Thunderbirds released their 2014 schedule which also did not include Quonset however show organizers are still planning to hold a conference regarding the event later in December. Without involvement by the Blue Angels or Thunderbirds it is still unlikely that a show will take place at Quonset.

To the shock of air show fans, on January 4, 2014, the Rhode Island Air National Guard Open House and Air Show was announced to take place on that year after a two-year hiatus in between. The show was scheduled for May 17–18, 2014, the Blue Angels headlining for the first time since 2011, The team made slight modifications to its schedule in late December following the abrupt cancellation of the MCAS Cherry Point Air Show, which was to take place the same weekend. Although the Cherry Point Air Show has since terminated its cancellation and will take place, the Blue Angels had already changed their schedule in order to appear at Quonset.

Other events 
Former United States President Richard Nixon served in the United States Navy from 1942 to 1946, rising from Lieutenant Junior Grade to Lieutenant Commander. He underwent basic training at Quonset Point in 1942 where he met William P. Rogers, later his first Secretary of State.

During the 1960s and early 1970s, four aircraft carriers used Quonset Point as their home port.

References

External links
 BASE: Advancing a Post-Military Landscape:  An extensive photographic survey of the Quonset Point & Davisville Naval Bases completed in 2000 by Erik Carlson & Erica Carpenter.

Peninsulas of Rhode Island
Landforms of Washington County, Rhode Island
Narragansett Bay
North Kingstown, Rhode Island